The Southedge Dam, also known as the Lake Mitchell Dam, is an earth filled embankment dam across the Mitchell River located in Southedge, in Far North Queensland, Australia.

Location and features

Southedge Dam has remained unused since it was opened in 1987; constructed and owned by Southedge Pastoral Company.

When the dam spills over it flows into the Mitchell River.

See also

List of dams and reservoirs in Queensland
Quaid Road

References

External links
Photo on Flickr

Reservoirs in Queensland
Dams completed in 1987
Buildings and structures in Far North Queensland
Dams in Queensland
Earth-filled dams
Embankment dams